The Kilkenny–Limerick rivalry is a hurling rivalry between Irish county teams Kilkenny and Limerick,  who first played each other in 1897. The fixture has been an irregular one due to both teams playing in separate provinces. Kilkenny's home ground is Nowlan Park and Limerick's home ground is the Gaelic Grounds, however, almost all of their championship meetings have been held at neutral venues, usually Croke Park.

While Kilkenny are regarded as one of the "big three" of hurling, with Cork and Tipperary completing the trio, Limerick are ranked fourth in the all-time roll of honour and have enjoyed sporadic periods of dominance at various stages throughout the history of the championship. The two teams have won a combined total of 47 All-Ireland Senior Hurling Championship titles.

As of 2022 Kilkenny and Limerick had met fifteen times in the hurling championship, including eight encounters in the All Ireland final stage of which Limerick have won five compared to Kilkenny who have won four. On 17 July 2022 they met in the All Ireland final for the first time in 15 years. Limerick prevailed on a scoreline of 1-31 to 2-26 to secure their third successive All Ireland triumph and an 11th overall.

History

1897: Inaugural clash

The very first meeting of Kilkenny and Limerick took place on 30 October 1898 to decide the destination of the 1897 All-Ireland crown. Both sides were hoping to win the All-Ireland championship for the first time. "The Cats" got off to a great start and led by 2-4 to 1-1 at half-time. Limerick, however, powered on in the second half and used their new technique of hooking. They got two quick goals early in the half and scored the winning goal from a free after fifty-two minutes.  At the final whistle Limerick emerged victorious by 3-4 to 2-4. It was Limerick's first All-Ireland title.

1933-1940: Honours even in greatest era

On 3 September 1933 the All-Ireland final between Kilkenny and Limerick set a new attendance record when 45,176 spectators turned up at Croke Park to see their first championship clash of the 20th century. Scores were at a premium in the opening half with the sides finishing level at 0-4 apiece at the interval. The exchanges were also keen in the second half, however, the last eight minutes provided an exhibition of power-packed hurling. Matty Power gave Kilkenny a one-point lead before Johnny Dunne scored the clinching goal to secure a 1-7 to 0-6 victory. It was Kilkenny's first championship defeat of Limerick.

Two years later on 1 September 1935 the attendance records tumbled once again when 46,591 to see the champions of 1934 and the reigning champions face off against each other. In spite of rain falling throughout the entire game both sides served up great entertainment. At the beginning of the second-half Lory Meagher sent over a huge point from midfield giving Kilkenny a lead which they would not surrender. The game ended in controversial circumstances for Limerick when they were awarded a close-in free to level the game. Jack Keane issued an instruction from the sideline that Timmy Ryan, the team captain, was to take the free and put the sliotar over the bar for the equalising point. As he lined up to take it, Mick Mackey pushed him aside and took the free himself. The shot dropped short and into the waiting hands of the Kilkenny goalkeeper Jimmy O'Connell and was cleared. The game ended shortly after with Kilkenny triumphing by 2–5 to 2–4.

For the third time in four years Kilkenny and Limerick did battle in the All-Ireland final on 6 September 1936. Once again the records tumbled when the attendance breached 50,000 for the first time ever. Lory Meagher opened the scoring with a Kilkenny point before Jackie Power responded with a goal for Limerick.  Johnny Dunne and Paddy McMahon also scored goals later in the half which saw Limerick lead by 2-3 to 1-4 at half-time. Limerick started the second half with a flourish as Dave Clohessy had a goal within three minutes. Clohesst bagged a second four minutes later before Mick Mackey went on a stunning solo run to set up Paddy McMahon for his second and Limerick's fifth goal of the game. The 5-6 to 1-5 victory gave Limerick their second championship victory over Kilkenny.

The All-Ireland final on 1 September 1940 brought Kilkenny and Limerick together for the last great game between the two outstanding teams of the decade. Terry Leahy and Jackie Power exchanged goals in the first half and there was little in it at the intervals as Kilkenny took 1 1-4 to 1-2 lead. Early in the second-half Kilkenny took a four-point lead, however, once Limerick captain Mick Mackey was deployed at midfield he proceeded to dominate the game. Two more goals for Limerick from Dick Stokes and John Mackey clinched a 3-7 to 1-7 victory.

1973-1974: All-Ireland clashes

On 2 September 1973, Kilkenny and Limerick clashed in an All-Ireland decider for the first time in thirty-three years. This was the sixth meeting between the sides with Limerick leading the early head-to-head 3-2. Limerick, however, started the game as rank outsiders against a Kilkenny team that were appearing in their third successive decider. In spite of this, Kilkenny suffered an amazing streak of bad luck and lost several key players in the lead in to the game. Éamonn Morrissey was forced to emigrate to Australia, Jim Treacy was ruled out due to injury, Kieran Purcell couldn’t play because of appendicitis and star forward Eddie Keher couldn’t play because of a broken collar bone. However what is seldom mentioned is that four very prominent hurlers Leonard Enright, Jim O'Donnell, Michael Graham and Mick O'Loughlin were all unavailable, for one reason or another to Limerick.In a tactical masterstroke, Limerick moved their own star forward, Éamonn Cregan, to centre-back where he nullified the Kilkenny attack. Richie Bennis top scored with ten points while Mossie Dowling scored what has been described as a "push over" goal to help Limerick to a 1-21 to 1-14 victory. It remained Limerick's last All-Ireland triumph, until they ended a 45 year wait in 2018.

Kilkenny didn't have to wait long to avenge that defeat as Limerick provided the opposition in the All-Ireland decider on 1 September 1974. A full-strength Kilkenny dominated the game in spite of Limerick starting as the favourites. Eddie Keher top scored with 1-11, while Richie Bennis was once again Limerick's ace marksman with five points. Kilkenny eventually triumphed by 3-19 to 1-13.

2005-2014: Kilkenny dominance

The All-Ireland quarter-final showdown between Kilkenny and Limerick on 31 July 2005 was the sides' first championship meeting in thirty-one years. It was also their first championship encounter outside of an All-Ireland decider. Kilkenny got off to the better start going into a 0-3 to 0-1 lead after ten minutes. Henry Shefflin hit a five-point glut between the nineteenth and 25th-minutes that proved the winning of a game that failed to fire. A goal would have done that, but Limerick’s best chance, netted by Donie Ryan just seconds into the second half, was ruled out for steps. Limerick reduced the gap to just a solitary point with twenty minutes to go, however, Kilkenny held on to secure an 0-18 to 0-13 victory.

Two years later in 2007, Limerick proved to be the surprise package in the championship. After finishing runners-up in the Munster final, subsequent defeats of Clare and a five-goal blitz of Waterford booked their place in the All-Ireland final against reigning champions Kilkenny on 2 September 2007. "The Cats" blitzed Limerick in the opening ten minutes sprinting into a 2-2 to no score lead. Goals from man of the match Eddie Brennan (who scored 1-5) and Henry Shefflin, who eventually went off injured, got Kilkenny off to the dream start. Limerick struggled to get a foothold until a twelfth minute Andrew O'Shaughnessy free. Kilkenny led by eight points at the interval, however, a determined Limerick kept fighting and got their reward in the 47th minute when Ollie Moran blasted home past P. J. Ryan in the Kilkenny goal. Limerick failed to kick on from this and Kilkenny eventually triumphed by 2-19 to 1-15.

On 29 July 2012, a bumper crowd of 38,116 saw Kilkenny take on Limerick in the All-Ireland quarter-final at Semple Stadium. It was their first ever championship clash outside of Croke Park. David Breen drilled in a first-half Limerick goal, but Henry Shefflin responded with two Kilkenny goals in the space of three minutes to give Kilkenny an interval lead of 2-7 to 1-9. In spite of this a shock looked like a very real possibility with Limerick, who had played into a stiff breeze, belying their massive underdog tag with a first-half display of poise and class. Even seven minutes into the second half, that shock still looked likely, with Limerick easily containing the anticipated Kilkenny backlash. The following twelve minutes saw Kilkenny up the ante and score 205 without reply to sink Limerick's challenge. Aidan Fogarty and Colin Fennelly bagged the goals that secured a 4-16 to 1-16 victory.

For the second time in three seasons, Kilkenny and Limerick faced off in the business end of the championship. The All-Ireland semi-final on 10 August 2014 saw Kilkenny enter the game as Leinster champions, while Limerick were the defeated finalists in Munster. 45,478 spectators witnessed a tense game that was punctuated buy heavy downpours of rain, with the floodlights coming on well before half-time. Limerick opened up a three-point lead as the interval approached, however, Kilkenny finished the half with an unanswered 1-2 as Michael Fennelly and Padraig Walsh flashed over points before a Richie Hogan goal. Limerick fought back in the second half, however, after Shane Dowling fired Limerick into a 0-16 to 1-11 lead in the 55th minute, the Treaty men would manage just one more point in the game. Kilkenny cut loose with a crucial Eoin Larkin goal and two pointed T. J. Reid frees to secure a 2-13 to 0-17 victory.

Statistics

Up to date as of 18 July 2022

All time championship results

Legend

Senior

Intermediate

Junior

Under-21

Minor

Records

Scorelines

 Biggest championship win:
 For Kilkenny: Kilkenny 3-19 - 1-13 Limerick, 1974 All-Ireland final, Croke Park, 1 September 1974
 For Limerick: Limerick 5-6 - 1-5 Kilkenny, 1936 All-Ireland final, Croke Park, 6 September 1936
 Highest aggregate (3-57, 66pts):
 Limerick 1-31 - 2-26 Kilkenny, 2022 All-Ireland Senior Hurling Championship Final, Croke Park, 17 July 2022

Most appearances

Top scorers

Top scorer in a single game:
For Kilkenny: 1-11
 Eddie Keher, Kilkenny 3-19 - 1-13 Limerick, 1974 All-Ireland final, Croke Park, 1 September 1974
For Limerick: 0-10
 Richie Bennis, Limerick 1-21 - 1-14 Kilkenny, All-Ireland final, Croke Park, 2 September 1973

Attendances

Highest attendance:
82,300 - Limerick 1-31 - 2-29 Kilkenny, All-Ireland final, Croke Park, 17 July 2022
Lowest attendance:
c.5,000 - Limerick 3-4 - 2-4 Kilkenny, All-Ireland final, Tipperary, 30 October 1898

External links
 Kilkenny v Limerick head-to-head results
 Three games to whet Limerick's appetite against the Cats
 Previous meetings of Limerick and Kilkenny (1973-2012)

References

Limerick
Limerick county hurling team rivalries